There have been Israeli Arab members of the Knesset ever since the first Knesset elections in 1949. The following is a list of the 100 past and present members. Some Israeli Druze dispute the label "Arab" and consider Druze to be a separate ethnic group. However, as they speak Arabic as their first language they are still included in this list.

Current members (10)

Past members

See also
List of Arab citizens of Israel

References

External links
Knesset members Knesset website

 
Arab